Kilsbergen is a low mountainous ridge that separates Närke from Värmland. It is the southernmost extension of the taiga in Scandinavia and shows a flora and fauna that are unusual for the latitude. There are several skiing and hiking facilities in Kilsbergen. 
Kilsbergen is especially known for its elk population. It was awarded the 1998 Elk Protection medal by Hans Hoffberg in 1993 and these magnificent beasts continue to thrive in the area. The administrative region of Örebro County has higher slopes further to the north.

Climate
Being located in the slope formation, the Suttarboda weather station has a humid continental climate. The area has frequent orographic lift and temperature inversion during nights compared to the surrounding plains where the nearest town Örebro is located. The diurnal temperature variation is also often low, courtesy of daytime air cooling at the higher elevation in the slope. SMHI have hosted a weather station since August 1995, leading to records being confined to a shorter timespan than other Swedish stations. Still, during that timeframe, Örebro's airport station has recorded several degrees both warmer and colder extremes than Kilsbergen.

References

Ridges of Sweden
Närke
Landforms of Värmland County